St Boniface High School may refer to:
St. Boniface High School (Kimberley, South Africa), a school in Kimberly, Northern Cape, South Africa.
St. Boniface Diocesan High School, a high school in Winnipeg, Manitoba, Canada.

See also
St Boniface College, a secondary school in Kavango Region, Namibia.
St Boniface's Catholic College, a Catholic secondary school in Plymouth, England.